Benjamin Thompson (1753–1814) was an American-born British physicist and inventor.

Benjamin Thompson may also refer to:

Entertainment
 Ben Thompson (actor) (born 1992), in Coronation Street
 Ben Thompson, author of Badass (book) and the Guts & Glory (book series)

Politics
 Benjamin Thompson (politician) (1798–1852), US congressman from Massachusetts
 Bennie Thompson (born 1948), US congressman from Mississippi
 Ben Thompson (Canadian politician) (1924–1998), lawyer and Progressive Conservative party member

Sports
 Ben Thompson (Australian footballer, born 1973) (born 1973), Australian rules footballer for St Kilda
 Ben Thompson (Australian footballer, born 1978) (born 1978), Australian rules footballer for Carlton
 Ben Thompson (footballer, born 1995) (born 1995), English footballer for Millwall
 Ben Thompson (footballer, born 2002), Welsh footballer
 Benjamin Thompson (cricketer) (born 1980), former English cricketer

Other
 Benjamin Thompson (farmer) (1806–1890), main benefactor of the University of New Hampshire
 Ben Thompson (lawman) (1843–1884), Texas gunfighter and marshal of Austin
 Benjamin Thompson (architect) (1918–2002), American architect and founder of Design Research
 Ben Thompson (writer), American business, technology, and media analyst

See also
 Benny Thomson (1913–1940), British footballer
 Samuel Benjamin Thompson, reconstruction era African American politician in South Carolina